The Key Man may refer to:

 Key Man, a 1954 American film, also known as A Life at Stake
 The Key Man (1957 film), a British B movie
 The Key Man (2011 film), an American crime thriller film